{{DISPLAYTITLE:C18H20O3}}
The molecular formula C18H20O3 (molar mass: 284.350 g/mol) may refer to:

 Bisdehydrodoisynolic acid (BDDA)
 16-Ketoestrone (16-Keto-E1)

Molecular formulas